St Beuno's may refer to:

 St Beuno's Church, Aberffraw, Anglesey
 St Beuno's Church, Clynnog Fawr, in Clynnog Fawr, Gwynedd
 St Beuno's Church, Penmorfa, Gwynedd
 St Beuno's Church, Pistyll, in Pistyll, Gwynedd
 St Beuno's Church, Trefdraeth, Anglesey
 St Beuno's Jesuit Spirituality Centre, in Tremeirchion, Denbighshire, Wales